North Milford Historic District is a national historic district located at Milford, Kent County, Delaware.  It encompasses 98 contributing buildings, 2 contributing sites, and 1 contributing structure in the original town as laid out in 1787.  It mainly consists of residential and commercial buildings, the majority of which were built before 1860.  They include examples of the Greek Revival and Federal styles.  Notable buildings include the "Billy Welch House,"  Welch/Hart House, "Sudler Apartments" (1793), James Hall House (c. 1880), and the "Towers" (c. 1783), home of Governor William Burton (1859-1863).  The Christ Church, James McColley House, Mill House, and Parson Thorne Mansion are located in the district and listed separately.

It was listed on the National Register of Historic Places in 1983.

References

Federal architecture in Delaware
Greek Revival architecture in Delaware
Historic districts in Kent County, Delaware
Milford, Delaware
Historic districts on the National Register of Historic Places in Delaware
National Register of Historic Places in Kent County, Delaware